Rumble is a 2002 Finnish comedy road-trip film with Tommi Korpela, Vesa-Matti Loiri, Jari Nissinen, and Jari Pehkonen.

Soundtrack
 Gene Vincent & His Blue Caps: B-I-Bickey-Bi, Bo-Bo-Go
 The Johnny Otis Show: Willie And The Hand Jive
 Johnny Burnette & The Rock'n Roll Trio: The Train Kept A'Rollin
 Don & Dewey: Koko Joe
 Roy Orbison & Teen Kings: Go! Go! Go!
 Augie Rios: Linda Lou
 Elvis Presley: Blue Moon
 Freddie Cannon: Tallahassie Lassie
 Sandy Nelson: Let There Be Drums
 The Flamingos: I Only Have Eyes For You
 Ray Sharpe: Linda Lu
 Thurston Harris: Little Bitty Pretty One
 Ronnie Dee: Action Packed
 Ronnie Self: Bop-A-Lena
 Jackie Morningstar: Rockin' In The Graveyard
 The Teen Queens: Eddie My Love
 Shep And The Limelites: Daddy's Home
 Lord Dent & His Invaders: Wolf Call
 The Wailers: Mau Mau
 The Capris: There's A Moon Out Tonight
 The Jive Bombers: Bad Boy

References

2002 films